Helen Corson Hovenden (1846–1935) was a Philadelphia area painter specializing in portraits of family pets, birds, and flowers.

Early life and education 

Born in Whitemarsh township, Helen Corson was the daughter of George and Martha Corson. She attended the Philadelphia School of Design for Women before traveling to Paris in 1875 to study painting at the Académie Julian, and she exhibited at the Paris Salons of 1876, 1879 and 1880.  While in Paris she also met artist Thomas Hovenden, and the two would marry in 1881, having returned to the United States the previous year.

Career 

Following her marriage, Helen settled with her husband on her father's homestead in Plymouth Meeting, Pennsylvania.  From 1881 to 1895, they used the Corson family barn, now known as Abolition Hall, as their studio.

Work

References 

1846 births
1935 deaths
19th-century American women artists
Philadelphia School of Design for Women alumni
American women painters
Artists from Philadelphia